The Forty-seventh Oklahoma Legislature was a meeting of the legislative branch of the government of Oklahoma, composed of the Senate and the House of Representatives. It met in Oklahoma City from January 5, 1999, to January 2, 2001, during the first two years of the second term of Governor Frank Keating.

Dates of sessions
Organizational day: January 5, 1999
Special session: January 20–28, 1999
First regular session: February 1-May 28, 1999
Special session: May 28, June 14–18, June 30, 1999
Second regular session: February 7-May 26, 2000
Special session: June 28, 2000
Previous: 46th Legislature • Next: 48th Legislature

Party composition

Senate

House of Representatives

Major legislation

Enacted

1999
Tax cut - The state legislature passed an income tax break.
Tax exemption - The state legislature passed an earned income tax credit for the poor.
Criminal justice reform - The state legislature enacted a Truth in Sentencing law.

2000
Teacher pay raise - The state legislature raised teacher pay by more than $3,000 annually.

Leadership
In Oklahoma, the lieutenant governor serves as a tie-breaking and ceremonial presiding officer of the Oklahoma Senate. Republican Lieutenant Governor Mary Fallin served as President of the Oklahoma Senate.

The Democratic Party held the majority of the seats on both the Oklahoma Senate and Oklahoma House of Representatives, giving them control of key leadership positions. Stratton Taylor served as President pro tempore of the Oklahoma Senate. Lloyd Benson served as Speaker of the Oklahoma House of Representatives. He was aided by Speaker Pro Tempore Larry Adair, Majority Floor Leader Tommy Thomas, Executive Majority Leader Don Kinnamon, Majority Whip Randy Beutler and Appropriations and Budget Chair Bill Settle.

Fred Stanley served as the House Democratic caucus chair and Darrell Gilbert served as the caucus secretary.

Fred Morgan served as the Republican Minority leader. Forrest Claunch served as the Republican caucus chair and Bill Case served as caucus secretary.

Members

Senate

Table based on list of Oklahoma state senators and years served. Districts 25, 27, 28, 36, and 53 did not exist.

House of Representatives

Table based on database.

See also
Oklahoma state elections, 1998

References

Oklahoma legislative sessions
1999 in Oklahoma
2000 in Oklahoma
1999 U.S. legislative sessions
2000 U.S. legislative sessions